A lift jet is a jet engine angled to provide an aircraft with aerostatic (i.e. not requiring the movement of air over an airfoil) lift, instead of (or in addition to) thrust. On a fixed-wing aircraft, lift jets may be installed as auxiliary engines, with a separate engine to provide forward thrust, or, as in the Harrier jump jet, may be vectored in flight to provide both.

Lift jets were first designed by German engineers during World War II, but none saw operational service. Many nations had experimental programs involving such engines by the early 1950s: one typical example was Rolls-Royce Thrust Measuring Rig (TMR), nicknamed the "Flying Bedstead", which took its lift solely from engine thrust. An early dedicated lift jet was the Rolls-Royce RB.108, first run in 1955.

In the early 1960s both the Soviet Union and Western nations considered the possibility of lift engines as a way of providing STOL or even VTOL capability to combat aircraft. The Soviets did side-by-side testing of versions of combat aircraft using variable geometry wings and lift jets (the results became the Mikoyan MiG-23 and Sukhoi Su-24). The problems with the auxiliary lift engine are high fuel consumption, extra weight (which is simply dead weight when the engines are not needed for lift), and taking up fuselage volume that could be used for fuel or other systems. The Soviets decided that variable-geometry wings provided comparable advantages in take-off performance without as many penalties.

One of the few operational military aircraft with auxiliary lift engines was the Soviet Yakovlev Yak-38, a VTOL fighter used by the AVMF's small aircraft carriers, which were not large enough to support conventional fixed-wing aircraft. The Yak-38 proved disappointing in service for most of the above reasons, having limited payload and range as well as dismal handling.

A novel alternative to the lift jet for auxiliary vertical thrust is employed by the STOVL Lockheed F-35B version of the U.S. Joint Strike Fighter. This does not have a jet lift engine, but a central lift fan that is powered by the main engine via a driveshaft. When not needed, it is declutched from the engine so that it does not consume power (analogous to the transfer case of a four-wheel drive vehicle). The operational viability of this system remains to be seen, and all of the above drawbacks still apply: it is dead weight in flight, and together with the aircraft's internal weapons bays it takes up a great deal of internal space, reducing fuel and avionics load and requiring a bulkier and wider fuselage cross-section (which passes on to the A and C versions, even though they don't have a fan or V/STOL capability). It has, however, in pre-operational testing proven the ability to take off vertically and go supersonic in level flight in the same mission, a first for a combat aircraft.

See also
 Lift fan
 VTOL

 
Jet engines
VTOL aircraft